John Robert Hall (December 14, 1916 – December 7, 1996) was a professional American football player who played running back for four seasons for the Chicago Cardinals and Detroit Lions. He was born in Kaufman, Texas.

References

1916 births
People from Kaufman, Texas
Players of American football from Texas
American football running backs
TCU Horned Frogs football players
Chicago Cardinals players
Detroit Lions players
1996 deaths